Filippo Alessio (born 24 December 2004) is an Italian football player who plays as a forward for the Under-19 squad of Empoli on loan from Vicenza.

Club career
After joining Vicenza in 2018 and coming through their youth ranks, Alessio made his professional debut for the club on 30 November 2021, coming in as a substitute during a Serie B match against Benevento. He collected two other senior appearances throughout the season, as Vicenza eventually got relegated to Serie C.

On 14 July 2022, Alessio officially extended his contract with the club until 2026.

On 31 January 2023, Alessio was loaned by Empoli for their Under-19 squad, with an option to buy.

International career
Alessio has represented Italy at youth international level, having played for the under-18 national team.

References

External links
 

2004 births
Living people
Italian footballers
Italy youth international footballers
Association football forwards
L.R. Vicenza players
Empoli F.C. players
Serie B players
Serie C players